Curmi is a surname. Notable people with the surname include:

Alessandro Curmi (1801–1857), Maltese composer and pianist
Francesca Curmi (born 2002), Maltese tennis player
Joseph Galea-Curmi (born 1964), Maltese clergyman and Catholic auxiliary bishop

See also
Curmi, an early beer brewed in the UK
Qormi